The 13th HUMINT Regiment is the Italian Army's only Human Intelligence unit. Formed on 1 August 1960 as Target Acquisition Battalion for the III Missile Brigade. In 1993 the battalion was disbanded. In 2005 the unit was reformed as a human intelligence battalion assigned to the army's RISTA-EW Brigade. Originally the unit was part of the army's artillery arm, but since becoming a human intelligence unit it has been designated as a "multi-arms unit". In 2018 the battalion was expanded to regiment and since then it is assigned to the Tactical Intelligence Brigade, which combines elements of the artillery and signal arms. The regiment is based in Anzio in Lazio.

History

Cold War 

On 1 August 1960 the Target Acquisition Battalion was formed in Vicenza and assigned to the III Missile Brigade. On 1 January 1961 the battalion was renamed XIII Artillery Reconnaissance Group and on 1 September 1962 XIII Target Acquisition Group. The group consisted of a group command, a command unit, the 1st Battery, which included a paratroopers section, and a light aviation component with SM.1019A planes. The group was tasked with providing tactical surveillance, target acquisition, and reconnaissance after the use of nuclear weapons.

On 1 March 1963 the group moved to Montorio Veronese, while the light aviation component was based at Boscomantico Airport. In 1964 the group added a Remotely Guided Aircraft Section with RP-7l Falconer - AN/USD-1B drones, and in 1967 the group received AB-204B helicopters. In October 1969 the group moved to Verona and on 1 September 1973 it was renamed XIII Reconnaissance and Target Acquisition Group ( - abbreviated XIII GRACO).

During the 1975 army reform the army disbanded the regimental level and newly independent battalions were granted for the first time their own flags. On 1 October 1975 the XIII Reconnaissance and Target Acquisition Group was renamed 13th Target Acquisition Group "Aquileia". On the same day the III Missile Brigade's Light Aviation Unit was merged into the group. After the reform the group consisted of the following units:

  13th Target Acquisition Group "Aquileia"
 Group Command
 Command and Services Battery
 Reconnaissance and Target Acquisition Battery
 Remotely Guided Aircraft Battery, with Canadair CL-89B "Midge" drones
 Air Component, at Boscomantico Airport
 398th Light Airplanes Squadron, with SM.1019A planes
 598th Multirole Helicopters Squadron, with AB-204B helicopters
 Light Aircraft Maintenance Squadron

On 29 November 1985 the Air Component was disbanded and on 16 December 1986 the group was granted its own flag. On 1 December 1991 the 3rd Missile Brigade "Aquileia" was reduced to 3rd Artillery Regiment "Aquileia". On 28 September 1992 the regiment was disbanded and the group was transferred to the Artillery Command of the 5th Army Corps. On 31 July 1993 the group transferred its Remotely Guided Aircraft Battery to the 41st Specialists Group "Cordenons" and the paratroopers company became an autonomous unit under the 5th Army Corps' Artillery Command. On 30 September 1993 the group was disbanded and its flag transferred on 10 November 1993 to the Shrine of the Flags in the Vittoriano in Rome.

Recent times 
On 28 June 2005 the 13th Battalion "Aquileia" was formed as human Intelligence unit of the RISTA-EW Brigade. The battalion received the flag and traditions of the 13th Target Acquisition Group "Aquileia". On 5 November 2018 the RISTA-EW Brigade was renamed Tactical Intelligence Brigade and on the same day the 13th Battalion "Aquileia" was reorganized as 13th HUMINT Regiment.

Current structure 
As of 2023 the 13th HUMINT Regiment consists of:

  Regimental Command, in Anzio
 Command and Logistic Support Company
 HUMINT Battalion "Aquileia"
 1st HUMINT Company
 2nd HUMINT Company
 3rd HUMINT Company

The Command and Logistic Support Battery fields the following sections: C3 Section, Transport and Materiel Section, Medical Section, and Commissariat Section.

External links
Italian Army Website: 13° Reggimento HUMINT

References

Artillery Regiments of Italy
2018 establishments in Italy